The CAVB qualification for the 2010 FIVB Women's Volleyball World Championship saw member nations compete for two places at the finals in Japan.

Draw
14 of the 53 CAVB national teams entered qualification. (DR Congo later withdrew) The teams were distributed according to their position in the FIVB Senior Women's Rankings as of 5 January 2008 using the serpentine system for their distribution. (Rankings shown in brackets) Teams ranked 1–4 did not compete in the second round, and automatically qualified for the third round.

Second round

Third round

Second round

Pool A
Venue:  Sir Molade Okoya-Thomas Hall, Lagos, Nigeria
Dates: June 3–7, 2009
All times are West Africa Time (UTC+01:00)

|}

|}

Pool B
Venue:  Maxaquene, Maputo, Mozambique
Dates: May 20–24, 2009
All times are Central Africa Time (UTC+02:00)

|}

|}

Third round

Pool C
Venue:  Kasarani Hall, Nairobi, Kenya
Dates: July 10–12, 2009
All times are East Africa Time (UTC+03:00)

|}

|}

Pool D
Venue:  OPOW Grande Salle, Batna, Algeria
Dates: July 22–24, 2009
All times are Central European Time (UTC+01:00)

|}

|}

References

External links
 2010 World Championship Qualification

2010 FIVB Volleyball Women's World Championship
2009 in volleyball
FIVB Volleyball World Championship qualification